Pyotr Solomonovich Stolyarsky, (29 April 1944) was a Soviet violinist and eminent pedagogue, honored as People's Artist of UkSSR (Ukrainian SSR) (1939). He was a member of CPSU (Communist Party of the Soviet Union) from 1939.

Biography
Stolyarsky was born in 1871 in Lypovets, Kiev Governorate, Russian Empire (in present-day Ukraine).  He first studied with his father, then with Stanisław Barcewicz in Warsaw, and subsequently with Emil Młynarski and Josef Karbulka in Odessa. In 1893  he graduated from Odessa music school. In 1893-1919 became a member of the Odessa  Opera House orchestra. From 1898 commenced his pedagogical activity  teaching children from the age of 4. In 1912 he opened his own music school. From 1919 he taught at the Odessa conservatory (where he became a professor in 1923). He founded the Odessa School of violin playing and became  one of the founders of the Soviet violin school.  With regard to violin teachers, through his teacher Emil Młynarski he is the "great-son" of Leopold Auer and the "great-great-son" of Joseph Joachim.  Through his teacher Stanisław Barcewicz he is the "great-son" of Niccolo Paganini.

His students won top prizes among important competitions.  In the 1935 Henryk Wieniawski Violin Competition in Warsaw two of his pupils won prizes: David Oistrakh and Boris Goldstein. (Official result; Ginette Neveu from France came first, David Oistrakh second, Henri Temianka won third, Boris Goldstein came in fourth and Josef Hassid from Poland received an honorary diploma.)

In 1937, at one of the most prestigious international competitions of its time, the   International Ysaye Competition, Stolyarsky students caused a sensation. Top prizes were garnered by David Oistrakh, Boris Goldshtein (Goldstein), Yelizaveta Gilels and Mikhail Fikhtengoltz.

"The results of the sessions created a profound impression: the Soviet school, with an assurance that bordered on arrogance, carried off all the prizes from the first down. The latter was awarded without the slightest discussion to the great David Oistrakh. Everyone else had to be content with crumbs; the Belgian violin school, though still a source of pride, failed, and its absence at the final was much commented on; Arthur Grumiaux and Carlo Van Neste, both young and inexperienced, were not able to convince the jury."

In the Soviet Union Stolyarsky's name was always  associated with  the special pedagogic  method for professional instruction(s) in music for gifted children (from an early age). 
Stolyarsky had superb personal qualities of a master teacher, highest  musical instincts and organizational talent which made it possible for him to attain maximum results.

Among his star pupils were David Oistrakh, Nathan Milstein, Iosif Brodsky, Samuil Furer, Boris Goldstein, Mikhail Goldstein, Daniel Shindarov, Elizabeth Gilels (wife of the Soviet violinist Leonid Kogan and sister to  the eminent pianist Emil Gilels), Igor Oistrakh, Mikhail Fikhtengoltz and  Eduard Grach who was one of his last pupils.

Stolyarsky's name is also associated with the School of Stolyarsky, a special music school for gifted children in Odessa (which was opened in 1933 upon his initiative). He was awarded the Order of the Red Banner of Labor.

Honours and awards
 Order of the Red Banner of Labour
 People's Artist of the Ukrainian SSR

He died in Sverdlovsk, USSR in 1944, aged 72.

References

Roth, Henry (1997). Violin Virtuosos: From Paganini to the 21st Century. Los Angeles, CA: California Classics Books. 
В сб.: Музыкальное исполнительство, в. 6, М., 1970, с. 162—193;  - Гринберг М., Пронин В., В классе П. С. Столярского
«Советская музыка», 1972, № 3. - Ойстрах Д., Фурер С., Мордкович Л., О нашем учителе. (К столетию П. С. Столярского)

External links
 The Queen Elisabeth Competition
 Stolyarsky archives (in Russian)
 Stolyarsky and his students
ДВА ФЕНОМЕНА СТОЛЯРСКОГО

1871 births
1944 deaths
People from Vinnytsia Oblast
People from Kiev Governorate
Pupils of Jan Hřímalý
Ukrainian Jews
Communist Party of the Soviet Union members
Ukrainian classical violinists
Soviet classical violinists
20th-century classical violinists
Male classical violinists
Jewish classical musicians
Soviet Jews
Recipients of the title of People's Artists of Ukraine
Violin pedagogues
Odesa Jews
20th-century male musicians